The Piva River is a river on the south western coast of Bougainville.

References

Rivers of Papua New Guinea